The lex pacificatoria is a Latin neologism, which translates as 'pacific law' or the 'law of the peacemakers'; it refers to the law relating to agreements or treaties ending a state of war or establishing a permanent peace between belligerents, as articulated by state and non-state peacemakers, such as peace negotiators. As such, it is a set of normativizing practices, the ‘industry standards’ of peacemakers. In its relationship with traditional legal doctrines such as the jus ad bellum, it is both incorporated in, and shapes, interpretations of binding legal instruments, and it can also be determinative of, or influence, court judgments. The term was popularized by the legal scholar Christine Bell in her 2008 book On the Law of Peace: Peace Agreements and the Lex Pacificatoria. Bell contrasts the notion with the Law of War, stressing that the art of post-war peace deserves as much consideration as the waging of war, and the notion is related to the jus post bellum, the concept of justice after war, with which it has been critiqued.

See also 

 Christine Bell
 Jus post bellum
 Law of War
 Peace treaty

References 

Law of war
Aftermath of war